Dominici is an Italian surname. Notable people with the surname include:

 Alice Dominici (born 1975), Italian swimmer
 Arturo Dominici (1918–1992), Italian actor
 Bernardo de' Dominici (1683–1759), Italian art historian and painter
 Caterina Dominici (1829–1894), Italian nun
 Charlie Dominici (born 1951), American singer
 Christophe Dominici (1972–2020), French rugby union footballer
 Franca Dominici (1907–1999), Italian actress
 Francesca Dominici, Italian statistician
 Francesco Dominici (operatic tenor) (1885–1968), Italian operatic tenor
 Francesco Dominici (painter) (c.1543–1578), Italian painter
 Giovanni Dominici (1356–1420), Italian Cardinal and writer
 Maria de Dominici (1645–1703), Maltese painter, sculptor, and nun
 Martina Dominici (born 2002), Argentine artistic gymnast
 Pedro César Dominici (1873–1954), Venezuelan playwright and writer

See also
 Dominici (disambiguation)
 Eva De Dominici, stage name of Argentinian model and actress Eva Carolina Quattrocci
 Domenici
 De Dominicis

Italian-language surnames
Patronymic surnames
Surnames from given names